Catantostomatidae is an extinct family of marine gastropods included in the Vetigastropoda and placed in the superfamily Pleurotomarioidea.

Genera
Catantostomatidae was established for the genus Catantostoma.

References

 
Middle Devonian first appearances
Middle Devonian extinctions
Gastropod families